This is a summary of notable incidents that have taken place at Disneyland Resort in Anaheim, California. While the California Department of Safety and Health (CDSH) has ruled that some guest-related incidents are Disney's fault, the majority of fatal incidents were the result of wrongdoing on the guests' part.

The term incidents refers to major accidents, injuries, deaths, and similar significant occurrences. While all of these incidents are required to be reported to regulatory authorities for investigation, attraction-related incidents usually fall into one of the following categories:

 Wrongdoing on the guest's part. This can be refusal to follow specific ride safety instructions, or deliberate intent to violate park rules.
 The result of a guest's known or unknown health issues.
 Negligence on the park's part, either by the ride operator or maintenance.
 A generic accident (e.g. slipping and falling) that is not a direct result of an action by any party.

In 1985, Time magazine reported that nearly 100 lawsuits are filed against Disney each year for numerous incidents.

Resort-wide incidents

Construction accidents
On August 29, 2019, a 37-year-old construction worker was fatally injured when a steel plate fell on him while working in a trench with other employees. Paramedics tried to perform CPR, but the man later died at a nearby hospital.

Guest altercations and incidents
 On August 6, 1970, the Youth International Party ("Yippies") held a publicly promoted gathering called the “First International Pow-Wow” at the park with the intent to "liberate" Disneyland from the establishment. Anticipating a large riot, every police department in Orange County provided additional security and a special court was set up to process mass arrests. The Pow-Wow was largely peaceful, although Disneyland closed early after the Yippies replaced the American flag at Fort Wilderness with their own. As police attempted to escort the Yippies out of the park, fights broke out between the Yippies and other guests, and at least 18 Yippies were arrested for violations such as trespassing, drug possession, and property damage.

On March 7, 1981, an 18-year-old man was fatally stabbed with a knife during a fight with a 28-year-old man, after the victim supposedly pinched the man's girlfriend in Tomorrowland. His family sued the park for $60 million. The jury found the park negligent for not summoning outside medical help, and awarded the family $600,000.
On September 14, 1985, a 7-year-old girl from Torrance, California, was crushed to death beneath the wheels of a bus at Disneyland. The girl was walking across the parking lot with her uncle while looking for his car when she fell under a moving charter bus that crushed her. Paramedics pronounced her dead at the scene.
On March 7, 1987, a 15-year-old boy was fatally shot in the Disneyland parking lot. The incident began as an early-morning confrontation between rival gang members before escalating into a brawl. 18-year-old Keleti Naea was convicted of second-degree murder, but the conviction was subsequently overturned by a state appellate court.
On July 6, 2019, a fight broke out among four people in Mickey's Toontown after reports that a woman had spit onto a man's face. The four people and their families were escorted off the property and criminal charges were considered. The altercation was filmed on a camera phone and uploaded to YouTube.

Parking structures
On February 23, 2007, two women suffered head injuries after falling out of a tram in the parking lot.
 On October 17, 2010, a 61-year-old man from Hickman, California, jumped to his death from the Mickey & Friends parking structure's top floor. He left behind a note citing "personal issues" for his suicide.
 On April 2, 2012, a 23-year-old man was found near the northwest corner of the Mickey & Friends parking structure and was pronounced dead at the scene. It was investigated as a suicide at the time, but there were no witnesses that saw the man jump.
 On November 26, 2016, a 40-year-old man jumped to his death from the Mickey & Friends parking structure just after 2:00 a.m. PST. He was rushed to UC Irvine Medical Center and pronounced dead at 3:08 a.m. PST.
 On February 13, 2017, a fire broke out on the Mickey & Friends parking structure's second floor. Seven people were treated for smoke inhalation. Four cars were destroyed and an additional four cars received major damage.
 On August 13, 2018, smoke filled the Mickey & Friends parking structure, forcing visitors to wait outside as firefighters doused the flames. The fire was out in about 30 minutes. One car was damaged.
 On December 3, 2022, a 51-year-old elementary school principal jumped from the top floor of the Mickey & Friends parking structure at approximately 9:00 p.m. PST. He was pronounced dead at the scene and his death was ruled a suicide. Due to this incident, elevators & escalators in the parking structure and tram services were stopped for the remainder of the night.
 On February 18, 2023, a woman reportedly fell or jumped from the Mickey & Friends parking structure at approximately 6:50 p.m. PST. She was severely injured at the scene and was pronounced dead at a local hospital.

Power outages
On April 15, 2012, a partial power outage occurred in the Hollywood Pictures Backlot at Disney California Adventure. The power outage was caused by ElecTRONica reaching its End of Line. Power was restored 20 seconds later and no Cast Members were needed.

On December 27, 2017, a major power outage struck Disneyland Park and temporarily closed down rides, mostly those located in Toontown and Fantasyland. Rides that lost power had to be evacuated, but no assistance from the local fire department was necessary and no injuries were reported. All attractions were fully operational again later in the day. According to a Disneyland spokesperson, the outage was caused by an electrical transformer.

Public health and infectious disease outbreaks
Between December 17 and December 20, 2014, visitors to the park were exposed to measles, resulting in an outbreak that affected residents of eight US states as well as Mexico and Canada. The California Department of Public Health was first notified of a suspected measles case on January 5, 2015, and by February 11, 2015, at least 39 individuals who had visited at least one of the two adjacent Disney parks during the exposure period had become ill. In addition to this likely direct exposure, secondary and unknown transmissions were numerous, resulting in at least 125 cases within the United States by February 11, 2015. The specific outbreak was declared over in the US in mid-April, 2015 after 42 days with no traceable transmission and 147 having been affected within the United States. This measles outbreak resulted in no known deaths.

After the operating day on March 13, 2020, the parks closed and the three Disneyland Resort hotels closed on March 16, 2020, all in response to the novel COVID-19 pandemic and pressure from California Governor Gavin Newsom in which a stay-at-home order was issued on March 19, 2020, prompting Downtown Disney to also close until it reopened on July 9, 2020. On March 5, 2021, it was announced by the California Department of Public Health that Disneyland could reopen with capacity restrictions beginning April 1, 2021. The following week, Disney CEO Bob Chapek said that the company would officially reopen the park on April 30, 2021.

Disney California Adventure

Guardians of the Galaxy – Mission: Breakout! (formerly The Twilight Zone Tower of Terror)

On August 18, 2010, a 20-year-old man was hospitalized after falling  from the platform of The Twilight Zone Tower of Terror. He was waiting in line to ride the attraction and climbed over a barrier before losing his balance.

Hyperion Theater

On April 22, 2003, a 36-year-old stage technician fell  from a catwalk in the Hyperion Theater, prompting an investigation by the California Occupational Safety and Health Administration (Cal/OSHA). The victim did not regain consciousness following the incident and died on May 18, 2003. In October 2003, Cal/OSHA fined the Disneyland Resort $18,350 for safety violations related to the technician's death.
On September 25, 2011, the flying carpet prop used during "A Whole New World" in Disney's Aladdin: A Musical Spectacular malfunctioned while flying through the theater, causing the carpet to flip over and suspend the actors playing Aladdin and Jasmine upside down. The performance was immediately stopped and the theater evacuated. No injuries or deaths were reported.

Incredicoaster (formerly California Screamin’)

On July 29, 2005, 25 guests were injured when the purple train rear-ended the red train. Of the 48 guests aboard the two trains, 15 were taken to the hospital for treatment of minor injuries.
On July 22, 2011, 23 people were rescued from California Screamin' by firefighters when a person's backpack fell out of one of the trains and landed on the track, causing the orange train to stop just after the loop but before the next block brake. It reopened two days later after the train was winched up the next hill, had its damaged wheels replaced, and was allowed to complete the circuit.
 On May 2, 2016, a passenger using a selfie stick caused park officials to shut down and evacuate the attraction for over an hour. Selfie sticks have been banned at Disney parks since June 2015 when the same ride was shut down due to a selfie stick.
 On August 6, 2016, 15 passengers were stuck on the ride for 45 minutes when a woman's purse fell onto the tracks, triggering an automatic stop. No injuries were reported.

Pixar Pal-A-Round (formerly Mickey’s Fun Wheel and Sun Wheel)

On October 2, 2014, 45 riders got stuck on Mickey's Fun Wheel for 90 minutes before being rescued. No injuries were reported.

Guest altercations
On February 18, 2012, an allegedly drunk 53-year-old man assaulted an employee at the Twilight Zone Tower of Terror's entrance gate around 3:30 p.m. PST The employee pepper-sprayed the man multiple times, which prompted the man to continue fighting until he was subdued by other guests. Security personnel then arrived and detained the man. Details as to what started the fight remain unknown. The man was eventually removed from the park and charged with assault and battery by the Anaheim Police Department. The incident was filmed via camera phone and uploaded to YouTube.

Disneyland Park

Alice in Wonderland

On December 21, 2000, a 15-year-old boy from Mesa, Arizona, suffered a broken leg after his left foot became stuck between a guardrail and the car in which he was riding. Police claimed that the boy might have dangled his leg outside of the car, causing the injury. The attraction reopened in less than six hours after an investigation.

America Sings

On July 8, 1974, 18-year-old Deborah Gail Stone, a new employee who had just graduated from Santa Ana High School, was crushed to death after slipping between a revolving wall and a stationary platform inside the America Sings attraction. She was in the wrong place during a ride intermission; it was unclear whether this was the result of inadequate training or a misstep, as the ride had only opened about a week earlier. The attraction was closed for two days while crews cleaned up and installed new carpeting, and installed warning lights and breakaway walls to prevent further incidents.

Big Thunder Mountain Railroad

On March 10, 1998, a 5-year-old boy was seriously injured when his foot became wedged between the passenger car's running board and the edge of the platform after the train temporarily paused before pulling into the unloading area. Each toe on his left foot required amputation. Disneyland then made improvements to the ride, though the family claims that the park would not acknowledge the accident as the reason for doing so.
On September 5, 2003, a 22-year-old man named Marcelo Torres died after suffering severe blunt-force trauma and extensive internal bleeding in a derailment of the Big Thunder Mountain Railroad roller coaster that also injured 10 other riders. The cause of the accident was determined to be improper maintenance. Investigation reports and discovery by the victim's attorney confirmed the fatal injuries occurred when the first passenger car collided with the underside of the locomotive. The derailment was the result of a mechanical failure that occurred because of omissions during a maintenance procedure. Fasteners on the left side upstop/guide wheel on the floating axle of the locomotive were not tightened and secured in accordance with specifications. As the train entered a tunnel, the axle came loose and jammed against a brake section, causing the locomotive to become airborne and hit the ceiling of the tunnel. The locomotive then fell on top of the first passenger car, crushing the victim. Some people blamed the new cost-conscious maintenance culture brought in by Paul Pressler and consultants McKinsey & Company in 1997, which included reliability-centered maintenance.

On July 8, 2004, three family members from Telluride, Colorado, suffered injuries after a coaster train collided with another one parked at the station. A lawsuit was later filed, having noted that the park allegedly failed to follow proper safety procedures on the ride and the ride was shut down temporarily for three weeks.

Columbia

On December 24, 1998, a heavy metal cleat fastened to the hull of the Sailing Ship Columbia tore loose, striking one 30-year-old cast member and two park guests. One of the guests, a 33-year-old man, died of a head injury at UCI Medical Center two days later. The normal tie line, an inelastic hemp rope designed to break easily, was improperly replaced for financial reasons by an elastic nylon rope that stretched and tore the cleat from the ship's wooden hull. Disney received much criticism for this incident as the result of its alleged policy of restricting outside medical personnel in the park to avoid frightening visitors, as well as for the fact that the employee in charge of the ship at the time had not been trained in its operation. After this incident, Disney reinstated lead foremen on most rides, and the Anaheim Police Department placed officers in the park to speed response. California's Division of Occupational Safety and Health investigated the incident and found fault with the training of the park employee who placed the docking line on the cleat. The cleat was not designed to help brake the ship and the employee should have been trained to recognize when the ship was approaching too fast. Ride procedures called for the ship's captain to reverse the ship if it overshot the dock and re-approach the dock at the correct speed. Disney was fined $12,500 by Cal/OSHA and settled a lawsuit brought by the victim's survivors for an estimated $25 million.

A Christmas Fantasy Parade 

 On December 15, 2018, a float with Santa Claus on his sled partially collapsed during a performance of A Christmas Fantasy Parade, causing the sled's front to fall downward quickly. This  caused the actor playing Santa to be thrown off the sled, leaving him dangling by his safety harness. The actor walked away unassisted and no injuries were reported. Performances resumed later in the day without the disabled float, with Santa moved to another float in the parade.

Disneyland Railroad

Within a week of Disneyland's opening on July 17, 1955, a brakeman pulled the switch connecting the Disneyland Railroad's main line with a siding at the Main Street, U.S.A. Station too soon as the Retlaw 2 freight train on the siding was passing the Retlaw 1 passenger train stopped at the station on the main line. The caboose on the end of the freight train had not made it fully across the switch when it was pulled, resulting in the caboose's front set of wheels correctly traveling along the siding while the rear set of wheels incorrectly traveled along the main line toward the passenger train, causing the caboose to swing to the side before colliding with a concrete slab and derailing upon impact. During the ensuing commotion, the erring brakeman, (presumably to avoid disciplinary action) quietly left the scene of the accident, exited the park, and was never seen again. No injuries were reported, and by the following year, the usage of sidings at stations on the DRR's main line was ended.
 In February 2000, a tree in the Adventureland section fell onto the DRR's Holiday Red freight train while it was in motion, damaging the awnings and their supports on the gondolas, as well as knocking off the cupola on top of the caboose before the train came to a stop. No injuries occurred as a result of this accident.
 At Tomorrowland Station in early 2004, accumulated diesel fumes in the firebox of the DRR's No. 3 Fred Gurley locomotive exploded after its fire suddenly went out. The explosion ejected the engineer from the locomotive's cab and inflicted serious burns on the fireman.
 On the afternoon of August 11, 2019, the DRR's No. 5 Ward Kimball locomotive broke down on a trestle over the entrance to Star Wars: Galaxy's Edge with a broken axle, forcing an evacuation of the train. No injuries were reported and the DRR was back in service by the following day.
 Between the night of December 28 and early morning of December 29, 2022, a fire broke out in the New Orleans Square section, damaging the freight depot. The cause of the fire is under investigation.

Indiana Jones Adventure

 On June 25, 2000, a 23-year-old woman exited the Indiana Jones ride complaining of a severe headache. She was hospitalized later that day and was discovered to have suffered a brain hemorrhage. She died on September 1, 2000, of a cerebral aneurysm. Her family's subsequent wrongful death lawsuit against Disney stated that the victim died because of "violent shaking and stresses imposed by the ride." In an interlocutory appeal (an appeal of a legal issue within the case prior to a decision on the case's merits), the California Supreme Court held that amusement parks are considered "common carriers" similar to commercially operated planes, trains, elevators, and ski lifts. This ruling imposes a heightened duty of care on amusement parks and requires them to provide the same degree of care and safety as do other common carriers.
 Disney settled the lawsuit for an undisclosed sum after the interlocutory appeal, but before a decision was rendered on the case's merits. The victim's medical costs were estimated at more than $1.3 million.

It's a Small World

 On the night of February 28, 2015, a small fire broke out in a backstage area of the park relatively close to the attraction. The flames were reported around 9:20 p.m. PST and were said to have been caused by the fireworks show that was rescheduled earlier that evening because of rain. A park spokeswoman said that the flames were contained by around 9:48 p.m. PST, and no injuries were reported. The attraction reopened the following day.

It's a Small World Holiday 

 On November 27, 2009, the ride broke down while a guest with quadriplegia was on the ride. The guest was stuck in the ride's "Goodbye Room", the final setting of It's a Small World Holiday, for 30–40 minutes before being evacuated. As he suffered from medical conditions that were aggravated by the "blaring Christmas carols" and was unable to exit the ride, the guest sued Disney for its inadequate evacuation procedures for disabled guests, and for not providing proper warnings for those who could not evacuate during a ride stoppage. On March 26, 2013, a jury awarded the man $8,000.

Jungle Cruise 

 On August 22, 2021, 66-year old woman Joanne Aguilar was visiting the park in a wheelchair. The wheelchair accessible boats for the Jungle Cruise were not available when she approached at the ride with her daughters, but she was told she could still ride. After the ride ended, Joanne's daughters attempted to help her exit the boat but she fell back and suffered a compound fracture in her leg. Aguilar later died on January 29, 2022, from septic shock following an infection. Aguilar's daughters filed a wrongful death lawsuit against the park.

Main Street

On April 16, 1981, a woman (who was at the park with her husband and four children) was standing in line to purchase popcorn at the park's hub at the end of Main Street near Sleeping Beauty's Castle when she collapsed and later died at Palm Harbor General Hospital in nearby Garden Grove, California.

Matterhorn

In May 1964, a 15-year-old boy from Long Beach, California, named Mark Maples was injured after he stood up in the Matterhorn Bobsleds and fell out. It was reported that his restraint was undone by his ride companion. He died three days later as a result of his injuries. This was Disneyland's first fatal incident.
On January 3, 1984, a 48-year-old woman from Fremont, California, named Dolly Regene Young was decapitated when she was thrown from a Matterhorn bobsled car and then struck by the next oncoming bobsled. An investigation found that her seat belt was not buckled. It is unclear whether the victim deliberately unfastened her belt or if the seat belt had malfunctioned.

Monorail

On June 17, 1966, 19-year-old Thomas Guy Cleveland from Northridge, CA, was killed while attempting to sneak into the park by climbing onto the monorail track. Ignoring a security officer's shouted warnings, he was struck by the train and dragged 30 to 40 feet down the track. The security guard later stated that he had to "hose the kid off the underside".

PeopleMover

In August 1967, a 16-year-old boy from Hawthorne, California, named Ricky Lee Yama was killed while jumping between two moving PeopleMover cars as the ride passed through a tunnel. He stumbled and fell onto the track, where an oncoming train of cars crushed him beneath its wheels and dragged his body a few hundred feet before it was stopped by a ride operator. The attraction had only been open for one month at the time.
In 1972, four teenage girls were riding the PeopleMover when one lost her mouse-ears cap. She and her cousin jumped onto the track to retrieve it. She broke her arm, hip, and pelvis, and had to be placed in a body brace and have a pin inserted into her leg. She sued Disney for not providing any warnings about the exit.
On June 7, 1980, 18-year-old Gerardo Gonzales  was crushed and killed by the PeopleMover while jumping between moving cars. The accident occurred as the ride entered the SuperSpeed tunnel and was very similar to the 1967 incident.

Pack Mules Through Nature's Wonderland
On an unknown date before 1973, a mule's saddle broke, causing a rider to fall off and tumble down an incline, injuring him. This resulted in a jury award of $142,000 (the largest against Disneyland until that time) and  the ride's permanent closure.

Rivers of America

On June 20, 1973, an 18-year-old New York resident and his 10-year-old brother stayed on Tom Sawyer's Island past closing time by hiding in an area that is off-limits to guests. When they wanted to leave the island, they tried to swim across the river but the younger boy didn't know how to swim. The older boy attempted to carry his brother on his back and drowned halfway across. His body was found the next morning. The younger brother was able to stay afloat by dog paddling until a ride operator rescued him.
On June 4, 1983, an 18-year-old man from Albuquerque, New Mexico, drowned in the Rivers of America while trying to pilot a rubber emergency boat from Tom Sawyer's Island which he and a friend had stolen from a restricted area of the island during Disneyland's annual Grad Nite. Both individuals were intoxicated at the time of the incident. The victim's mother sued Disneyland for allowing her inebriated son onto the premises and the travel agency that had arranged the trip for not properly supervising the teenagers. The lawsuits were unsuccessful.
 On January 21, 2001, a six-year-old girl lost two-thirds of her left index finger while playing with a toy rifle mounted on a turret on Fort Wilderness on Tom Sawyer's Island. Disney did not report this incident to OSHA, as serious injury accidents must only be reported if the incident occurred on a ride. The girl was rushed to a hospital, but doctors were unable to reattach her finger. OSHA stated that the incident did not fall under their review, as accidents and injuries that occur on playground equipment do not qualify for OSHA reporting.

Roger Rabbit's Car Toon Spin 

 On September 22, 2000, a four-year-old boy named Brandon Zucker fell out of the ride vehicle on Roger Rabbit's Car Toon Spin and was dragged underneath the car, causing serious internal injuries, cardiac arrest, and brain damage. On October 7, 2000, Disneyland changed its emergency policy and began instructing ride operators to call 911 first, instead of the Disney security center, in order to speed emergency staff to any incident on park property. Records showed that more than five minutes passed between the time the victim fell out of the ride vehicle and when emergency personnel were contacted. A Disney spokesman claimed that the timing of the policy change and this incident were coincidental. An investigation ending in December 2000 concluded that a lap bar had malfunctioned and that the victim was placed in the wrong seat in the ride vehicle, too close to the opening. Three months after the incident, the Permanent Ride Amusement branch of California's Division of Occupational Safety instructed Disney to install additional safety features on the ride.  In January 2002, Disney settled with the victim's family, based on the cost of the victim's continuing medical care and suffering; Disney was not required to accept blame. The victim never fully recovered from his injuries and died on January 26, 2009, aged thirteen, at Children's Hospital of Orange County.

Skyway
	
Paramedics rescued him and took him to an area hospital for treatment for minor injuries. The man filed a $25,000 lawsuit against Disney, claiming that he had simply fallen out of the ride. However, just before the trial date in September 1996, the victim admitted that he had purposely jumped out of the ride; the suit was subsequently dropped.

Space Mountain

On August 14, 1979, a 31-year-old woman became sick after riding Space Mountain. At the unload area, she was unable to exit the vehicle. Although employees told her to stay seated while the vehicle was removed from the track, other ride operators did not realize that her vehicle was supposed to be removed, and they accidentally sent her through the ride a second time. She arrived at the unloading zone semi-conscious. The victim was taken to Palm Harbor Hospital, where she remained in a coma and died one week later. The coroner's report attributed the death to natural causes; a heart tumor had dislodged and entered her brain. A subsequent lawsuit against the park was dismissed.

 In 1983, an 18-year-old man from Quartz Hill, California, fell off Space Mountain and was paralyzed from the waist down. On March 7, a jury found Disneyland blameless. During the trial, the jury was taken to the park to ride Space Mountain, and several of the ride's cars were brought into the courtroom to demonstrate their use.
 
On August 2, 2000, nine people suffered minor injuries when the ride's safety-control systems caused the train to abruptly stop. This was Space Mountain's first mechanical problem since its 1977 opening.
In April 2013, Disney voluntarily closed Space Mountain, the Matterhorn Bobsleds, and Soarin' Over California over OSHA-related issues so that employee safety protocols could be reviewed. Downtime for each attraction differed, with Space Mountain being closed the longest at one month. The safety review stemmed from seven OSHA fines that were initiated from a November 2012 incident where a worker fell down the outside of the Space Mountain building and broke several bones. Cal/OSHA originally fined Disney a record $234,850 but the fine was reduced to $82,000 and also fined the contracting company $60,995 for safety violations.

On January 29, 2019, a man in his 20s with cognitive disabilities used force to maneuver out of his lap-bar restraint and climbed out of the moving train in the dark during a slower portion of the ride as the coaster was making its initial climb. The man's absence was not noted until the end of the ride when his friends discovered him missing, whereupon operators stopped the ride and guided him to safety. The man was uninjured, but was later taken to the hospital for a precautionary examination. The ride reopened on February 1, 2019, after an inspection.

Storybook Land Canal Boats

 On March 16, 2005, a four-year-old boy broke a finger and severed the tip of his thumb when his fingers were crushed between the boat and the dock while passengers were unloading. The ride was closed for nearly two days while state authorities investigated the accident. Authorities directed Disneyland to lower and repair rubber bumpers along the dock's edge, and to make sure ride operators inform passengers to keep their hands in the boat while it docks.

Submarine Voyage

On June 11, 1979, a woman claimed to suffer a back injury when one submarine rear-ended another.  She was awarded almost $30,000.

Mickey's Toontown

 On May 28, 2013, two small explosions in trash cans caused the Mickey's Toontown area of the park to be evacuated. Officials believe the explosions were caused by two plastic bottles filled with dry ice (or dry ice bombs) taken from a nearby ice cream stand, and the bomb squad was called to investigate. No injuries were reported. A 22-year-old concession-stand worker from Long Beach, California, named Christian Barnes was arrested and charged with creating and detonating the two dry-ice bombs. Barnes pled guilty to one misdemeanor count of possession of a destructive device. He was sentenced to 36 days in jail, three years of informal probation, 100 hours of community service, and was banned for life from all Disney parks.

Costumed characters
 In 1976, an unidentified woman sued the Disney Parks Corporation because she claimed that one of the Three Little Pigs at the It's a Small World attraction grabbed and fondled her. She claimed to have gained  as a result of the incident and sued Disney for $150,000 in damages for assault and battery, false imprisonment, and humiliation. The plaintiff dropped charges after Disney's lawyers presented her with a photo of the costume, which had only inoperable stub arms, a common feature among the shorter characters that was eliminated in later years.
 In 1978, it was alleged that an employee playing Winnie the Pooh slapped a 10-year-old girl named Debbie Lopez and caused bruising, recurring headaches, and possible brain damage. The worker testified that the child was tugging at his costume from behind. When he turned around, he accidentally struck the girl in her ear. At one point, the employee entered the courtroom after a recess wearing the Pooh costume and responded to questions while on the witness stand as Pooh would, including dancing a jig. Appearing as Pooh showed the jury that the costume's arms were too low to the ground to slap a girl of the victim's height. The jury acquitted the worker after 21 minutes of deliberation.

 In August 2012, an African-American family claimed a cast member playing the White Rabbit refused to hug or interact with their six-year-old son for racial reasons. The family also claimed that the character interacted with White and Asian children. While Disney did offer the family an apology letter and park passes, the family refused the offer and filed a lawsuit since Disney would not confirm whether the employee was still employed with them. The lawsuit was settled on December 30, 2013.

 On July 31, 2022, a similar incident occurred when a concerned father shared a video of his children’s recent visit to Disneyland with their grandmother. In the video, Rapunzel seemingly ignores the only Black children in a crowd of guests. The children run over to Rapunzel as soon as they spot her, and their grandmother tells them they need to get in line. The character attendant can be heard clearly advising the grandmother that there is no line and they are just “walking around.” Still, the princess is taking photos with another guest, so the children patiently wait at the side. Rapunzel then walks off but continues to stop and visit with other children along the way. Roaming characters usually try to keep moving, especially if a crowd is starting to form. After a while of following her and the grandmother drawing attention to the children having been ignored, she appears to finally look at them at the end of the video.

Disneyland Hotel
 On September 3, 1994, a 76 year-old man jumped to his death from a ninth-floor balcony of the Disneyland Hotel. This was the first suicide known to be committed at the Disneyland Resort.
 On July 6, 1996, a 23-year-old man either jumped or fell to his death from the 14th floor of the Disneyland Hotel. He was not a hotel guest and had climbed over several balconies.
 On May 2, 2008, a 48-year-old man jumped from a 14th-story balcony of the Wonder Tower (now Frontier Tower) at the Disneyland Hotel, falling to his death in a parking lot.

See also
Amusement park accidents
List of incidents at Disney parks

References

Disneyland Resort
Disney-related lists
Disneyland Resort